The 1864 United States presidential election in Maine took place on November 8, 1864, as part of the 1864 United States presidential election. Voters chose seven representatives, or electors to the Electoral College, who voted for president and vice president.

Maine voted for the National Union candidate, Abraham Lincoln, over the Democratic candidate, George B. McClellan. Lincoln won the state by a margin of 18.14%.

Results

See also
 United States presidential elections in Maine

References

Maine
1864
1864 Maine elections